Apa (P-121) is a Amazonas-class corvette currently operated by the Brazilian Navy. She was originally named Scarborough (CG51) while she was being built for the Trinidad and Tobago Coast Guard.

Background 

The Amazonas class were originally named as the Port of Spain class and built for the Trinidad and Tobago Coast Guard. Then, despite two of the vessels having been completed at the time and awaiting delivery, and with crew training ongoing in the United Kingdom, the Government of the Republic of Trinidad and Tobago (GORTT) cancelled the order in September 2010.

In December 2011 it was reported that the Brazilian Navy were interested in buying the vessels, and possibly up to five additional vessels of the same design.

Construction and career 
Scarborough was built by BAE Systems Maritime in Glasgow and launched on 15 July 2010. The ship was sold to the Brazilian Navy and renamed Apa (P-121). She was commissioned on 30 November 2012.

Gallery

References

2010 ships
Amazonas-class corvettes
Ships built on the River Clyde